The Second Massimov Cabinet was the 9th composition under the Government of Kazakhstan that was led by Karim Massimov. It was formed on 2 April 2014 after Prime Minister Serik Akhmetov resigned from office just weeks after Kazakhstan's currency tenge lost its value, causing an inflation which led to protests in the cities. As a result, President Nursultan Nazarbayev appointed Massimov, who was quickly approved by the Parliament to be the Prime Minister due to his previous record of promoting business-friendly policies during his previous term as the Prime Minister from 2007 to 2012.

The government ended after President Nazarbayev appointed Massimov as the head of the National Security Committee on 8 September 2016. Massimov was succeeded by his First Deputy Bakhytzhan Sagintayev who led the new government after he was confirmed by the Parliament the next day on 9 September.

Composition

References 

Cabinets of Kazakhstan
2014 in Kazakhstan
Cabinets established in 2014
2014 establishments in Kazakhstan